Piers Vitebsky is an anthropologist and is the Head of Social Science at the Scott Polar Research Institute, University of Cambridge, England.

Education
Vitebsky studied his undergraduate degree in Classics with Modern and Medieval Languages at the University of Cambridge, graduating in 1971. He then went on to take a diploma in Social Anthropology at the Oxford University. In the late seventies he was an affiliated student at the Delhi School of Economics. Eventually he completed his PhD at the School of Oriental and African Studies in London in 1982.

Career
Since the 1980s, Vitebsky has carried out long-term fieldwork among with the Evens of Siberia, and among shamans and shifting cultivators in tribal India and Sri Lanka. In the Russian Arctic, he was the first westerner since the Revolution to live long-term with an indigenous community. Only after working for several months at the Museum of Anthropology and Ethnography in Leningrad was he allowed to fly out to Yakutsk in 1988.

Vitebsky has been Head of Anthropology and Russian Northern Studies at the Scott Polar Research Institute since 1986.

His current focus is on reindeer herders' perceptions of and responses to climate change.

Media work
Vitebsky's numerous documentary film collaborations include 'Arctic aviators' (National Geographic) and 'Flightpaths to the gods' (BBC2, on the Nazca lines in Peru), and 'Siberia: after the shaman' (Channel 4), which won first prize at the Film Festival of the European Foundation for the Environment and was screened at the Margaret Mead Film Festival in New York City.

Awards
Vitebsky has won the Gilchrist Expedition Award from the Royal Geographical Society. In 2006 he won the Kiriyama Prize for non-fiction. He was also runner up for the Victor Turner Prize for Ethnographic Writing in 2007 - awarded annually by Society for Humanistic Anthropology, American Anthropological Association.

Works

Books
 Dialogues with the dead: the discussion of mortality among the Sora of eastern India (Cambridge University Press 1993; reprinted Delhi: Foundation Books 1993);
 The shaman: voyages of the soul from the Arctic to the Amazon (London: Duncan Baird; Boston: Little Brown 1995; reprinted as 'Shamanism' by University of Oklahoma Press 2001; translated into 15 languages);
 
 Vitebsky, P.G. and Monosi, R., 2011. Indigenous knowledge: a handbook of Sora culture (in Sora), Visakhapatnam.

Journal articles

2015
 Vitebsky, P. and Alekseyev, A., 2015. Siberia. Annual Review of Anthropology, v. 44, p. 439-455. 
 Vitebsky, P. and Alekseyev, A., 2015. Casting Timeshadows: Pleasure and Sadness of Moving among Nomadic Reindeer Herders in north-east Siberia. Mobilities, v. 10, p. 518-530. 
 Vitebsky, P. and Alekseyev, A., 2015. What is a reindeer? Indigenous perspectives from northeast Siberia. Polar Record, v. 51, p. 413-421. 
 Willerslev, R., Vitebsky, P. and Alekseyev, A., 2015. Sacrifice as the ideal hunt: a cosmological explanation for the origin of reindeer domestication. Journal of the Royal Anthropological Institute, v. 21, p. 1-23. 
 Willerslev, R., Vitebsky, P. and Alekseyev, A., 2015. Defending the thesis on the ‘hunter's double bind’. Journal of the Royal Anthropological Institute, v. 21, p. 28-31.

2014
 Vitebsky, P.G. and Anatoly, A., 2014. Nomadismes d’Asie centrale et septentrionale. Diogène, v. 246-247, p. 258-264.

2010
 Vitebsky, P.G., 2010. From materfamilias to dinner-lady: the administrative destruction of the reindeer herder's family life. Anthropology of East Europe Review, v. 28, p. 38-50.
 Vitebsky, P.G., 2010. Introducing the 'Natural dimension' into Arctic humanities research. Northern Notes, v. 34, p. 13-14.

2008
 Vitebsky, P.G., 2008. Loving and forgetting: moments of inarticulacy in Tribal India. Journal of the Royal Anthropological Institute, v. 14, p. 243-261.
 Vitebsky, P.G., Rees, W.G., Stammler, F.M. and Danks, F.S., 2008. Vulverability of European reindeer husbandry to global change. Climatic Change:, v. 87, p. 199-217.

Book chapters
 Vitebsky, P.G., 2012. Afterword, in Brightman, M., Grotti, V.E. and Ulturgasheva, O. (eds.) Animism in rainforest and tundra: personhood, animals, plants and things in contemporary Amazonia and Siberia, Berghahn. v. 2133, p. 202-219.
 Vitebsky, P.G., 2011. Historical time and ethnographic present: an anthropologist's experience of comparing change and loss in the Siberian Arctic and the Indian jungle, in Ziker, J.P. and Stammler, F. (eds.) Histories from the North: environments, movements and narrative, Boise State University. p. 71-77.
 Vitebsky, P.G., 2011. Repeated returns and special friends: from mythic encounter to shared history, in Howell, S. and Talle, A. (eds.) Returns to the field: multitemporal research and contemporary anthropology, Bloomington. p. 180-202.
 Vitebsky, P.G., Habeck, J.O., Comaroff, J., Costopoulos, A. and Navarette, F., 2010. Ethnographic researches in the North and their contribution to global anthropology, in Oktyabrskaya, . (ed.) North and South: dialogue between cultures and civilizations, Novosibirsk: Institute of Archaeology and Ethnography. p. 63-66.

References

External links
'Loving and Forgetting: a farewell to ancestors' Sora attitudes toward the dead. A presentation given at Cambridge 4 May 2007 based on the Henry Myers Lecture given at EASA Biennial Conference 2006 (film)

British anthropologists
Academics of the University of Cambridge
Anthropologists of religion
Living people
Year of birth missing (living people)
People of the Scott Polar Research Institute
People associated with The Institute for Cultural Research